25P-NBOMe (2C-P-NBOMe, NBOMe-2C-P) is a derivative of the phenethylamine 2C-P. It acts in a similar manner to related compounds such as 25I-NBOMe, which are potent agonists at the 5HT2A receptor. 25P-NBOMe has been sold as a drug and produces similar effects in humans to related compounds such as 25I-NBOMe and 25C-NBOMe.

Legality

United Kingdom

See also 
 25E-NBOMe (NBOMe-2C-E)
 25D-NBOMe (NBOMe-2C-D)
 25I-NBOMe (NBOMe-2C-I)
 25B-NBOMe (NBOMe-2C-B)
 25C-NBOMe (NBOMe-2C-C)
 25TFM-NBOMe (NBOMe-2C-TFM)
 25T7-NBOMe (NBOMe-2C-T-7)

References 

25-NB (psychedelics)
Designer drugs